The Long Road Home is a 1999 American television film, directed and written by Craig Clyde. It stars Michael Ansara (in his final film role before his death in 2013), T.J. Lowther and Mary Elizabeth Winstead. The film tells the story of a city boy's life after having to live with his grandparents in a village after his parents' death.

Plot
After his mother died, 12-year-old Seth George (T.J. Lowther) goes to live with his grandparents on their farm. Grouchy old Murdock (Michael Ansara) is not very happy with the presence of his grandson and is rather hard on him. He was strongly opposed to the mixed marriage of his daughter and doesn't want to hear anything about Seth's Indian father who died a hero in Vietnam when Seth was still a baby. His grandmother (Sandra Shotwell) on the other hand was very fond of Seth but after a while she passes away. Seth also meets the charming yet sporting Annie Jacobs (Mary Elizabeth Winstead). Seth struggles at the farm with his grumpy grandfather and strives to win Annie's heart at the same time.

Cast

 Michael Ansara as Murdock Haynes
 T.J. Lowther as Seth George
 Mary Elizabeth Winstead as Annie Jacobs
 Sandra Shotwell as Neldra Haynes
 Al Harrington as Andy Lamebull
 Craig Clyde as Jim Jacobs
 Joyce Cohen as Missy Jacobs
 K.C. Clyde as Rob Taylor

Reception

References

External links
 

1999 drama films
1999 television films
1999 films
American drama television films
1990s English-language films
1990s American films